Agathemerodea was a suborder of the insect order Phasmatodea, but this placement is now considered a very doubtful.

It consists of the sole genus Agathemera, with the several species limited to the mountainous regions of Argentina, Chile and Peru.

External links

Phasmid Study Group: Agathemerodea

Phasmatodea